YLE Extra was a Finnish television channel owned and operated by Yle, the channel launched on 27 April 2007. It replaced YLE24. YLE Extra ceased broadcasting on 1 January 2008 and it was replaced by YLE TV1+, a temporary channel which broadcasts Yle TV1 with fixed subtitles.

References

External links
extra.yle.fi

Yle television channels
Defunct television channels in Finland
Television channels and stations established in 2007
Television channels and stations disestablished in 2008